

LP
 Dad's Army, BBC Records, 1975. Radio series episodes Something Nasty in the Vault and Sgt. Wilson's Little Secret.

Volume releases
Since 1990, the BBC have been releasing the original radio episodes. First on cassette and now on CD as well. Below is list of all the CD and cassette releases, up to date.

Volume 1: A Jumbo-Sized Problem
Ten Seconds from Now
A Jumbo-Sized Problem
When Did You Last See Your Money?
Time on My Hands

Volume 2: Command Decision
The Man and the Hour
Museum Piece
Command Decision
The Enemy Within the Gates

Volume 3: A Stripe for Frazer
The Honourable Man
High Finance
The Battle of Godfrey's Cottage
A Stripe for Frazer

Volume 4: Sergeant Wilson's Little Secret
The Armoured Might of Lance Corporal Jones
Sergeant Wilson's Little Secret
Operation Kilt
Battle School

Volume 5: Sorry Wrong Number
Something Nasty in the Vault
The Showing Up of Corporal Jones
The Loneliness of the Long Distance Walker
Sorry Wrong Number

Volume 6: The Menace from the Deep
Under Fire
The Bullet is Not for Firing
Room at the Bottom
Menace from the Deep

Volume 7: Don't Forget the Diver
Don't Forget the Diver
If the Cap Fits...
A Brush with the Law
Getting the Bird

Volume 8: My British Buddy
The King was in his Counting House
The Godiva Affair
The Deadly Attachment
My British Buddy

Volume 9: A Man of Action
The Day the Balloon Went Up
Branded
Round and Round Went the Great Big Wheel
A Man of Action

Volume 10: A Soldier's Farewell
A Soldier's Farewell
All is Safely Gathered In
The Big Parade
Asleep in the Deep

Volume 11: Put That Light Out
Put That Light Out!
Sergeant - Save My Boy!
Uninvited Guests
Fallen Idol

Volume 12: Absent Friends
No Spring for Frazer
Sons of the Sea
Brain Versus Brawn
Absent Friends

For this point on all the releases were released on both cassette and CD.

Volume 13: Mum's Army
Boots, Boots, Boots
War Dance 
Mum's Army
Don't Fence Me In
  
Volume 14: Big Guns
A. Wilson (Manager)?
The Great White Hunter
Things That Go Bump in the Night
Big Guns

Volume 15: We Know Our Onions
We Know Our Onions
The Royal Train 
A Question of Reference
The Recruit

Volume 16: Keep Young and Beautiful
Keep Young and Beautiful
The Captain's Car 
The Two and a Half Feathers
Turkey Dinner

Christmas Special: Present Arms
Present Arms

Collections
In 2003 and 2004, the BBC released three CD collections one for each series. Priced around £80.

Dad's Army: Collector's Edition – Series 1
Dad's Army: Collector's Edition – Series 2
Dad's Army: Collector's Edition – Series 3

Music only

LP
Dad's Army – Original Cast Recording, Warner K56186, 1976. The original cast recording of the stage show.

7" singles
Who Do You Think You're Kidding, Mr. Hitler?, PYE 7N 17854, 1969
A side: Who Do You Think You're Kidding, Mr. Hitler (Dad's Army Theme), Bud Flanagan.
B side: It Ain't Gonna Rain on Me Mo!, Bernard Bedford & Chorus
The theme song recording was reissued in 1975.

Dad's Army March / What Did You Do in the War?, Columbia DB8766, 1971
Released for Christmas 1971 following the release of the film. Both tracks were performed by the Dad's Army Choir comprising Arthur Lowe, John Le Mesurier, Clive Dunn, John Laurie, James Beck, Arnold Ridley and Ian Lavender. The Dad's Army March was included in the film but without lyrics. What Did You Do in the War? includes solo parts by each member accompanied by the chorus.

We Stood Alone / Down Our Way, Columbia DB8952, 1972
Both tracks were credited to the Dad's Army Choir comprising Arthur Lowe, John Le Mesurier, Clive Dunn, John Laurie, James Beck, Arnold Ridley, Ian Lavender and Bill Pertwee.

CD
 Who Do You Think You Are Kidding Mr.Hitler?, River Records RRCD13/PT, 2001. Music from the TV series performed by various wartime artists, including the series theme performed by Bud Flanagan.
 Dads Army: Music From The Television Series, various artists, 2005, CD41 label, catalogue number CD41010

Dad's Army